Heinrich Gottfried Philipp Gengler (25 July 1817 – 28 November 1901)  was a German historian of law, Geheimrat and academic lecturer.

Philipp Gengler  was born in Bamberg in Germany. He studied at the University of Würzburg and at the  University of Heidelberg. In 1842 he obtained from the University of Erlangen the Ph. D. degree. One year later he qualified there for inauguration. In  1847 he became a lecturer  in German legal history at Erlangen University, and in 1851 he was awarded a full professorship at the University of Erlangen. He died in Erlangen,  aged 84.

His son was the  ornithologíst Josef Gengler.

Works (selection) 
 Deutsche Rechtsgeschichte im Grundrisse. Palm, Erlangen 1849 (online, Google).
 Schwabenspiegels Landrechtsbuch. Theodor Blaesing, Erlangen 1853.
 Ueber Aeneas Sylvius in seiner Bedeutung für die deutsche Rechtsgeschichte. Junge, Erlangen 1860 (online, Google).
 Regesten und Urkunden zur Verfassungs- und Rechtsgeschichte der deutschen Städte im Mittelalter. Erster Band,   Enke, Erlangen 1863 (online, Google; Additions; Corrections; Table of contents).

Literature

External links

Footnotes 

1817 births
1901 deaths
People from Bamberg
Jurists from Bavaria
20th-century German historians
German male non-fiction writers